WXXW-LP (channel 6) was a low-power television station in Binghamton, New York, United States. The station was owned by the Johnson Broadcasting Company (unrelated to the Houston-based broadcaster).

WXXW-LP operated as a "Franken-FM," an analog television station that took advantage of the NTSC standard, in which the audio feed can be tuned in on any analog FM radio at the proper frequency; for channel 6, the frequency is 87.75 MHz, just below the FM band. As such, WXXW-LP was programmed as a radio station at 87.7 with an urban oldies format billed as "Passion Radio."

WXXW-LP ceased broadcasting on or shortly before July 13, 2021, the date set by the Federal Communications Commission for all remaining low-power television stations to cease broadcasting in analog. Johnson Broadcasting Company held a construction permit to return to the air on the same channel 6. WXXW-LP's license was canceled on July 8, 2022, due to the station failing to file an application for digital operation prior to the expiration of its construction permit.

References

XXW-LP
Television channels and stations established in 2006
2006 establishments in New York (state)
Defunct television stations in the United States
Television channels and stations disestablished in 2022
2022 disestablishments in New York (state)